Kid Chaos (previously known as Kid Vicious) is a side-scrolling platform video game developed by Magnetic Fields, and published by Ocean Software, for the Amiga and Amiga CD32 in 1994.

Former Magnetic Fields artist, Andrew Morris, agreed for a scan of his original protagonist concept artwork to be included. This was the first time it had been revealed to the public. 'Cosmic Kitten' (alternatively 'Claws'), as he was then known, was to be the Amiga's answers to Sonic the Hedgehog. However, before publication, the character was re-designed as a caveboy known simply as 'Kid' to avoid any legal conflict with SEGA, which have always been very protective of their intellectual property.

References

External links
Mobygames
Hall of Light
Lemon Amiga

Amiga games
Amiga CD32 games
1994 video games
Side-scrolling video games
Platform games
Ocean Software games
Video games developed in the United Kingdom
Magnetic Fields (video game developer) games